Afroz Alam Sahil (born 28 February 1987) is an Indian journalist and author who covers topics pertaining to Indian politics, history and society. Currently, he is an editor at BeyondHeadlines.

Disappointed with the mainstream media due to their deliberate ignorance towards the stories of marginalised section of society, he founded his own online portal BeyondHeadlines in 2011 along with his friend Mohammad Reyaz, currently an associate professor of journalism in Aliah University, West Bengal.

He is the author of five books and translated one. As a journalist, he has received national recognition and more than 20 awards, felicitations and fellowships in the last 10 years. Afroz writes for BBC Hindi, ThePrint, India Times, Down to Earth, TwoCircles and many other media outlets as a freelance Journalist. He geared up his career from print to TV journalism and did a commendable job in the online news as well.

Early life and education

Afroz was born in West Champaran, Bihar in a middle class Muslim Family. He finished his schooling from Raj Inter College and Gulab Memorial College, Bettiah, a city in West Champaran, Bihar.

He moved to New Delhi in 2005 from his hometown Bettiah and completed his graduation course in Mass Media from Jamia Millia Islamia, Central University, India. Then he joined and earned post-graduate degree in Mass Communication from A.J.K. Mass Communication Research Centre, Jamia Millia Islamia, New Delhi.

Career

Afroz Sahil started his career with Hindustan Express (Urdu daily) as a reporter. After which, he worked for Dainik Hindustan (daily Hindi Newspaper) as a freelancer for an Editorial page (Features: Diwan-e-Aam, Diwan-e-Khas, Muquabla, Anhad, Election Page, Nai Dishayen, Remix Weekend and many others newspaper and magazine). Then he did a job at TV9 MUMBAI and UNI TV as a Special Correspondent and RTI Desk In-charge. 
        
He also worked for TwoCircles as an editor.  After that he worked for BeyondHeadlines as an editor. He has been regularly writing for Inquilab, (Urdu Daily) as a columnist for last ten years.

Apart from his journalistic career, he has also been a recipient of the following fellowship:—

 RTI FELLOW 2014 at Ministry of Personnel, Govt. of India
 Media Fellow −2017 at National Foundation for India
 Road Safety Journalism Fellowship −2018 at World Health Organization
 Junior Research Fellow 2018–20 at Centre for Cultural Resources and Training, Ministry of Culture, Govt. of India  
 Sahapedia-UNESCO Fellowship 2019 at Sahapedia

Authorship

 Jamia Aur Gandhi (Hindi), New Delhi: INSAAN International Publication, 2019. 
 Professor Abdul Bari: Azadi ki ladai ka ek krantikaari Yodhha (Hindi), New Delhi: INSAAN International Publication, 2019.
 Sheikh Gulab: Neel Andolan ke ek nayak (Hindi), New Delhi: INSAAN International Publication, 2017.
 Pir Muhammad Munis (Hindi), New Delhi: INSAAN International Publication, 2015.
 Suchana Ka Adhikar (Hindi), New Delhi: Jama’at-e-Islami Hind, 2010. 
 Translated a book The Rights of Muslim Women in Muslim Personal Law published by Sarojini Naidu Centre for Women Studies, JMI.

Awards and achievements

 Karmaveer Chakra Award —2019 by International confederation of NGO (iCONGO) in partnership with United Nations.
 WHO (World Health Organisation) Road Safety Journalism Fellowship −2018. 
 Pir Muhammad Munis Journalism Award −2018 by All Bihar Urdu Teacher's Association, East Champaran, Bihar. 
 Gandhi Peace Award −2019 by All Bihar Urdu Teacher's Association, East Champaran, Bihar. 
 National Media Award −2017 by National Foundation for India, New Delhi. 
 Felicitated by SQY Study Circle in 2019 at 2nd Professor Abdul Bari Memorial Lecture, Patna. 
 Felicitated by CERT in 2018 at All India History Summit, Nehru Memorial Museum & Library, New Delhi. 
 Felicitated by Gandhi Smriti and Darshan Samiti and Indialogue Foundation in 2017 at Zakir Hussain College, Delhi University. 
 MAIMAR-E-OKHLA Award −2018 for contribution in the field of Media by Volunteers of Change. 
 RTI Fellow −2014 (Ministry of Personnel, Govt. of India) 
 Excellence Award-2011 by Society for Promotion of Professional Academic and Cultural Excellence and Vivekananda International Foundation.
 Person of the Year-2010 by Twocircles.net (TCN), Boston, USA and Ministry of Minority Affairs, Govt of India.
 AGRI Youth Icon & Journalist of Year-2010 by AGRI Mumbai.
 Awarded by Universal Knowledge Trust, in appreciation of Extraordinary community service in 2011.
 Felicitated by TCN in 2011 at Taj President, Mumbai.
 Idrisia Award-2012 by Idrisia National Foundation.
 Felicitated by AMU Student Union in 2012 at Kenedy Hall, AMU, Aligarh.
 Felicitated by Solidarity & SIO in 2012 at Difference & Democracy Conference in Ernakulam, Kerala.
 Felicitated by SIO at Media Amelioration, New Delhi in 2019.
 Felicitated by Urdu Patrakar Sangh and Urdu Media Centre, Malegaon in 2015. 
 Felicitated by Hikmat Foundation, Bihar in 2015.
 Felicitated by Delhi Public School, Tajpur (Bihar) in 2019.

References

External links
 Afroz Alam Sahil writes for BBC Hindi
 Afroz talks with Two Circles portal
 Champaran Post web portal
 Afroz Alam Sahil official Twitter
 Afroz on UN based organization The International Youth Council (IYC) 
 Right to Information Act

Living people
1987 births
Jamia Millia Islamia alumni
Journalists from Bihar
People from Bettiah
Indian male journalists
Indian political journalists